Trubachyov's Detachment Is Fighting is a 1957 Soviet drama film directed by Ilya Frez. Sequel of Vasyok Trubachyov and His Comrades.

Plot 
The film takes place during the Great Patriotic War. The film shows the adventures that happened to the pioneers, who found themselves on the territory occupied by the fascists.

Cast 
 Oleg Vishnev as 	Vasyok Trubachyov
 Vladimir Semenovich as Sasha Bulgakov
 Aleksandr Chudakov as Kolya Odintsov
 Vyacheslav Devkin as  Kolya Mazin
 Georgi Aleksandrov as  Petya Rusakov
 Vladimir Yemelyanov as Miron Dmitrievich
 Natalya Rychagova as Nyura Sinitsyna
 Yuri Bogolyubov as  Sergey Nikolaevich, teacher
 Leonid Kharitonov as  Mitya Burtsev
 Anatoly Kubatsky as  grandfather Mikhailo
 Ivan Ryzhov as Yakov Pryanik

See also
 Vasyok Trubachyov and His Comrades (1955)

References

External links 
 

1957 films
1950s Russian-language films
Soviet drama films
Russian children's drama films
1950s children's drama films
Soviet black-and-white films
Gorky Film Studio films
1957 drama films
Russian black-and-white films
Soviet children's films